The Erwin Schrödinger Prize (German: Erwin Schrödinger-Preis) is an annual award presented by the Austrian Academy of Sciences for lifetime achievement by Austrians in the fields of mathematics and natural sciences.  The prize was established in 1958, and was first awarded to its namesake, Erwin Schrödinger.

Prize criteria and endowment
The prize is awarded at the discretion of the Austrian Academy of Sciences to scholars resident in Austria for excellence and achievements in the mathematical and scientific disciplines in the broadest sense. The prize is not awarded to full members of the Academy.

The award ceremony is held annually in October. The prize includes an annual stipend currently of € 15 000, paid monthly.

Prize winners 
Source:

1956 Erwin Schrödinger
1958 Felix Machatschki
1960 Erich Schmid
1962 Marietta Blau
1963 Ludwig Flamm and Karl Przibram
1964 Otto Kratky
1965 Fritz Wessely
1966 Georg Stetter
1967 Berta Karlik and Gustav Ortner
1968 Hans Nowotny
1969 Walter Thirring
1970 Erika Cremer
1971 Richard Biebl
1972 Fritz Regler and Paul Urban
1973 Hans Tuppy
1974 Otto Hittmair and Peter Weinzierl
1975 Richard Kiefer and Erwin Plöckinger
1976 Herbert W. König and Ferdinand Steinhauser
1977 Viktor Gutmann and Helmut Rauch
1978 Edmund Hlawka and Günther Porod
1979 Heinz Parkus
1980 Peter Klaudy and Hans List
1981 Kurt Komarek
1982 Othmar Preining
1983 Josef Schurz and Peter Schuster
1984 Leopold Schmetterer and Josef Zemann
1985 Adolf Neckel and Karl Schlögl
1986 Walter Majerotto and Horst Wahl
1987 Edwin Franz Hengge and Franz Seitelberger
1988 Wolfgang Kummer and Fritz Paschke
1989 Johannes Pötzl
1990 Manfred W. Breiter and Karl Kordesch
1991 Siegfried J. Bauer and Willibald Riedler
1992 Josef F. K. Huber and Karlheinz Seeger
1993 Benno F. Lux and Oskar F. Olaj
1994 Tilmann Märk and Heide Narnhofer
1995 Heinz Gamsjäger and Jürgen Hafner
1996 Alfred Kluwick
1997 Werner Lindinger and Thomas Schönfeld
1998 Peter Zoller
1999 Johann Mulzer
2000 Erich Gornik and Hans Troger
2001 Bernhard Kräutler and Siegfried Selberherr
2002 Ekkehart Tillmanns
2003 Erwin S. Hochmair and Hildegunde Piza
2004 Anton Stütz and Jakob Yngvason
2005 Franz Dieter Fischer and Rainer Kotz
2006 Rainer Blatt
2007 Georg Brasseur and Thomas Jenuwein
2008 Georg Wick
2009 Bernd Mayer
2010 Walter Kutschera
2011 Gerhard A. Holzapfel
2012 Jürgen Knoblich
2013 Nick Barton
2014 Denise P. Barlow
2015  und Jiří Friml
2016 Ortrun Mittelsten Scheid and Jürgen Sandkühler
2017 Francesca Ferlaino
2018 Elly Tanaka and Peter Jonas
2019 Karlheinz Gröchenig and Helmut Ritsch
2020 László Erdős and Markus Arndt
2022 Christoph Bock

See also 
 Schrödinger Medal

References

External links
 

Austrian science and technology awards